Katheleen Lindor (born ) was a French female artistic gymnast, representing her nation at international competitions.

She participated at the 2007 World Artistic Gymnastics Championships, and 2008 Summer Olympics in Beijing, China.

She is the twin sister of Lindsay Lindor.

References

External links 

https://database.fig-gymnastics.com/public/gymnasts/biography/3702/true?backUrl=%2Fpublic%2Fresults%2Fdisplay%2F544%3FidAgeCategory%3D4%26idCategory%3D70%23anchor_40741
http://www.gettyimages.com.au/photos/katheleen-lindor?excludenudity=true&sort=mostpopular&mediatype=photography&phrase=katheleen%20lindor

1989 births
Living people
French female artistic gymnasts
Place of birth missing (living people)
Olympic gymnasts of France
Gymnasts at the 2008 Summer Olympics
Mediterranean Games silver medalists for France
Mediterranean Games medalists in gymnastics
Competitors at the 2005 Mediterranean Games
21st-century French women